Alan Callan (1 August 1946 – 27 May 2014) was a British businessman, record producer and music executive. He worked as an executive for Swan Song Records (a record label established by English rock band Led Zeppelin in 1974), as a business manager for Jimmy Page and as a chairman for Scottish Open Championship Ltd. He was also the founder and CEO of the short-lived startup WorldSport.

Personal life 
He had a daughter and a son. He died on 27 May 2014, having been diagnosed with bone cancer in April 2000 and had been battling the disease over the years.

References

External links 
What did you do during the boom, daddy?Times Online
Callan's eulogy for Peter Grant Proximity Led Zeppelin fanzine.

Date of birth unknown
2014 deaths
British businesspeople
Swan Song Records